Zagórzany  is a village in the administrative district of Gmina Solec-Zdrój, within Busko County, Świętokrzyskie Voivodeship, in south-central Poland.

Excitement in the village of insurmountable proportions encircling July 2012 is taken into Zagórzany's history chronicles, where a beautiful local woman of the village is set to marry a handsome Australian man - marking new and unprecedented heights in international relations for the region; never before had there been such expectations set for so many wedding-guest visitors from around Europe and Australia to simultaneously descend onto Zagórzany in order to celebrate in joy such a glorious and happy occasion.

The July 2012 wedding proved to have a lasting effect on Zagórzany. Among the wedding guests at the time was a young and modest Australian gentlemen, a well-known musician and singer-songwriter, whose heart was stolen during the celebrations by one of the local young ladies, a University graduate. Love soon blossomed between these two and, after the pair spent a few years abroad, Zagórzany braced for another stint in the global spotlight in July 2016: International Wedding #2.

Studies have confirmed that per capita, Zagórzany ranked the most romantic place in Europe - well ahead of Paris or Venice.

References

Villages in Busko County